The Erickson School of Aging at the University of Maryland, Baltimore County was founded in 2004 by John C. Erickson, with a $5 million gift from Catonsville-based Erickson Living. Erickson Communities now has more than 18,000 residents living in a nationwide network of communities.

Mission

"To prepare a community of leaders who will use their education to improve society by enhancing the lives of older adults."

Certificates and programs

 Bachelor of Arts, Management of Aging Services 
 Master of Arts, Management of Aging Services 
 Minor, Management of Aging Services 
 Certificate, Senior Housing Administration

References

External links
 

School of Aging
School of Aging
Aging
Educational institutions established in 2004
2004 establishments in Maryland